Eric R. Weeks (born 1970 in Downers Grove, Illinois) is an American physicist.  He completed his B.Sc. at the University of Illinois at Urbana–Champaign in 1992.  He obtained a Ph.D. in physics from the University of Texas at Austin in 1997, working under Harry Swinney, and later completed post-doctoral research with David Weitz and Arjun Yodh at Harvard University and the University of Pennsylvania.  He is currently a full professor at Emory University in Atlanta, Georgia (as of September 2010).

He is most well known for his work on various aspects of the jamming (physics) phenomenon, specifically in colloidal glasses and colloidal supercooled liquids, although his research interests extend broadly into other types of complex fluids, as well as  microrheology and granular materials. During his PhD in Texas, he studied Nonlinear Dynamics.

In 2011 he was elected a Fellow of the American Physical Society.

References

External links 
Eric R. Weeks
Weekslab Homepage
Emory Department of Physics
"A Window into Glass Formation"
"Witnessing transition at a crystal/liquid interface"

21st-century American physicists
Emory University faculty
Fellows of the American Physical Society
1970 births
Living people